Cho Geun-hyun is a South Korean art director and film director. His directorial debut, the hit drama thriller 26 Years (2012) with over 2.9 million admissions, was voted Best Korean Film by Twitter users held by KOFIC in December 2012. He was internationally recognized for his second feature Late Spring (2014), which won a total of six awards, including Best Foreign Feature at the 23rd Arizona International Film Festival, Best Film at the 14th Milan International Film Festival Awards and Best Asian Narrative Film at the 13th Asian Film Festival of Dallas in 2014.

Filmography

As art director 
L'Abri  (2002)
A Tale of Two Sisters (2003)
My Mother, the Mermaid (2004)
Heaven's Soldiers (2005)
Duelist (2005)
From Here to Seoul (short film, 2006)
Forbidden Quest (2006) 
Evil Twin (2007)
My Father (2007)
Radio Dayz (2008) 
Go Go 70s (2008)
The Accidental Gangster and the Mistaken Courtesan (2008)
Love, In Between (2010)
My Way (2011)
The Concubine (2012)

As film director 
26 Years (2012) (also credited as script editor)
Late Spring (2014) (also credited as script editor)
The Lightning Man's Secret (2015)
Heung-boo: The Revolutionist (2018)

Art department 
Herb (2007)
Love Now (2007)
A Tale of Legendary Libido (2008)
More than Blue (2009)

Awards 
2003 2nd Korean Film Awards: Best Art Direction (A Tale of Two Sisters)
2005 26th Blue Dragon Film Awards: Best Art Direction (award shared with Lee Hyeong-ju) (Duelist)
2006 43rd Grand Bell Awards: Best Art Direction (award shared with Lee Hyeong-ju) (Duelist)
2006 5th Korean Film Awards: Best Art Direction (Forbidden Quest)
2006 27th Blue Dragon Film Awards: Best Art Direction (award shared with Hong Joo-hee) (Forbidden Quest)
2006 26th Korean Association of Film Critics Awards: Best Art Direction (Forbidden Quest)

References

External links 
 
 
 
 

Year of birth missing (living people)
Living people
South Korean film directors
Place of birth missing (living people)